The Toyon Canyon Landfill is a controversial landfill wholly within Griffith Park in the Los Feliz hillside neighborhood of greater Hollywood in central Los Angeles, California in the Santa Monica Mountains. Filling began in 1957 and ended in 1985. A lawsuit in 1959 attempted to stop the project but was unsuccessful.  A summary of the lawsuit is available here. There was a move in the 1980s to expand the landfill into Royce's Canyon to the northwest, but that was defeated.

Landfill gas is collected from the decomposing waste and used for power generation. The landfill is managed by the  Los Angeles Bureau of Sanitation which plans to have "low intensity open meadow area intended for passive recreational activities".  The landfill was 'closed' (to the specifications of the regulatory agencies) as of December 31, 2008.  The landfill will be maintained and monitored in accordance with SCAQMD 1150.1, provisions of AB 32, and other regulations for at least 30 years.  The landfill is being landscaped with native plants such as toyon, oak, California poppy, lupine and others, while non-native plants such as mustard and tumbleweed are being actively removed.

In June 2012 the Los Angeles Regional Water Quality Control Board approved a revised Waste Discharge Requirements (permit) for Toyon Canyon, after opportunity for public input.  It took effect July 1, 2012.

The landfill is clearly visible from California State Route 2, Route 134 (Ventura Freeway) and I-5 freeways in Los Angeles and from the surrounding hillsides. It's also visible on Google Earth. ( 34° 8'38.36"N 118°18'6.29"W) 

During the May 2007 fire in Griffith Park, the helispot was used to help fight the fire.  At times there were two helicopters on the pad and a third waiting to fill its tank.

Technical data
Filled Area:  
Total Weight of  Trash: 16,000,000 tons
Total Volume of fill:  30,700,000 cubic yards
Type of Material Disposed of: Class III waste (residential garbage, street sweepings, Construction and demolition waste)
Number of Gas Extraction Wells: 200 approx.
Active Groundwater Monitoring Wells: 13
Landfill Gas Migration Monitoring Probes: 16 (single and multi-depth)
Ambient Air Monitoring Stations: 2
AQMD Site permits (on AQMD's site with emissions and compliance data): LA City, Power Plant - current, and Power Plant - older.
Power Generation Equipment: 2 internal combustion engines
Power Plant Owner: Montauk Energy 
Power Plant Operator: SCS Engineers 
Landfill Gas Flare: John Zink  diameter, 5 burner tips, 2000 cfm capacity (on standby).
Regulatory Agencies:  United States Environmental Protection Agency,  Cal. EPA, California Integrated Waste Management Board, California Air Resources Board, SCAQMD, State Water Resources Control Board - Los Angeles,  City of Los Angeles - Industrial Waste Management Division, and  City of Los Angeles - Environmental Affairs Department - Local Enforcement Agency.

Movies and television
Like much of Los Angeles and Southern California, Griffith Park has been used in countless movies and television shows.  Toyon Canyon, the adjoining section Mt. Hollywood Drive, and associated areas have appeared in the following (among others):

Ghost Whisper - several times
E.R. - doubling for Croatia
Terminator 3
Grey's Anatomy - the crash that leads to the death of Dr. McDreamy
Scorpion - 2 episodes
Mad Men
Jericho
Criminal Minds
The Unit
Splinter
The Fast and the Furious
2 Fast 2 Furious
The Fast and the Furious: Tokyo Drift
Sons of Anarchy
numerous commercials for cars
a notable commercial for car insurance
a music video
several student films

See also
Landfill in the United States

References

External links
LAcitysan.org: Toyon Canyon Landfill factsheet
Leagle.com: Griffith v. City of Los Angeles Lawsuit (1950-1985)

Landfills in California
Griffith Park
Environment of Greater Los Angeles
Santa Monica Mountains
1957 establishments in California
Former landfills in California